James T. Enright (b. 1932) was a professor of behavioral physiology at the Scripps Institution of Oceanography, University of California, San Diego. He has conducted research on circadian rhythms and sensory physiology in both crustaceans and humans.  He was named as an AAAS Fellow in 1981 for his work in biological timing mechanisms and marine ecology. He was awarded, also in 1981, the Alexander von Humboldt Foundation's Senior U.S. Scientist Award for his work in visual physiology and optical illusions.

References

External links
UCSD Home Page

University of California, San Diego faculty
Fellows of the American Association for the Advancement of Science
University of California, Los Angeles alumni
Scripps Institution of Oceanography faculty
Humboldt Research Award recipients
Living people
1932 births